Clayton Heathcock is an organic chemist, Professor of Chemistry, and Dean of the College of Chemistry at the University of California, Berkeley.  Professor Heathcock is well known for his accomplishments in the synthesis of complex polycyclic natural products and for his contributions to the chemistry community.  In 1995 he became a member of the National Academy of Sciences.

Clayton Heathcock received his B.Sc. in chemistry in 1958 from Abilene Christian University and a Ph.D in organic chemistry in 1963 from the University of Colorado.  His graduate work was carried out under the direction of Alfred Hassner and dealt with the synthesis of steroidal heterocycles. He then completed a postdoctoral fellowship with Gilbert Stork at Columbia University.  In 1964, he joined the faculty at UC Berkeley where he is currently Professor in the Graduate School and Dean of the College of Chemistry.

Heathcock is known for tackling the chemical synthesis of complex, polycyclic natural products, often possessing unusual biological activity including Daphniphyllum alkaloids, altohyrtin, zaragozic acid, spongistatins, and many others.  He has also developed novel methodology for organic synthesis such as a modification of the Evans aldol reaction.

In addition to his research and teaching accomplishments, Clayton Heathcock has contributed to the chemical community by serving as chairman of the Division of Organic Chemistry of the American Chemical Society (ACS), chairman of the National Institutes of Health Medicinal Chemistry Study Section, chairman of the Gordon Research Conference on Stereochemistry, chair of the Chemistry Division of the American Association for the Advancement of Science, and Editor-in Chief of the journals Organic Syntheses and the Journal of Organic Chemistry.

Clayton Heathcock is the author of several hundred research papers  and a coauthor of the popular college textbook Introduction to Organic Chemistry.

Awards that Clayton Heathcock has received include Ernest Guenther Award (ACS) (1986); ACS Award for Creative Work in Organic Synthesis (1990); A.C. Cope Scholar (1990); Prelog Medal, ETH (1991); American Academy of Arts and Sciences (1991); National Academy of Sciences (1995); Centenary Medal, Royal Society of Chemistry (1996); H. C. Brown Award (ACS) (2002); Paul Gassman Award for Distinguished Service (ACS) (2004).

References
Heathcock's research group homepage
UC Berkeley profile
Streitwieser, Andrew; Heathcock, Clayton H., Kosower, Edward M. (1992). Introduction to Organic Chemistry, 4th ed., Macmillan Publishing Company, New York. .

1936 births
Living people
Abilene Christian University alumni
University of Colorado alumni
Columbia University faculty
UC Berkeley College of Chemistry faculty
21st-century American chemists
Members of the United States National Academy of Sciences